Steve Bisley (born 26 December 1951) is an Australian writer, film and television actor. He is best known for his roles in the films Mad Max and The Great Gatsby. On TV, some of his better-known roles include Detective Sergeant Jack Christey on Water Rats and Jim Knight on Doctor Doctor.

Early life
Bisley was born at Lake Munmorah, New South Wales and grew up on a small farm called Stillways. The son of schoolteachers, he moved to Sydney just after his seventeenth birthday. After a few years of working in various jobs, he enrolled in the National Institute of Dramatic Art (NIDA), graduating with a degree in acting in 1977. Other actors in his class included Mel Gibson, Judy Davis, Debra Lawrance and Sally McKenzie.

Career
While still training at NIDA, Bisley and his friend Mel Gibson made their film debuts in Summer City (1977). Towards the end of the course, they were approached by director George Miller and asked to audition for parts in Mad Max (1979). Both were successful and Bisley went on to play "Jim Goose", the best friend and partner to Gibson's titular character. Mad Max has since become a cult classic and it launched Mel Gibson to mainstream stardom. After this, Bisley played the lead role in the thriller The Chain Reaction (1980), with Mel Gibson making a brief appearance. His other early film credits include roles in The Highest Honor (1983), The Winds of Jarrah (1983), Fast Talking (1984) and Silver City (1984).

In 1980, Bisley played Joe Byrne in The Last Outlaw, a critically acclaimed TV mini-series about Ned Kelly. He was also seen in A Town Like Alice, The Boy in the Bush and the original 1985 miniseries of the medical drama The Flying Doctors.

In 1986, he and his family temporarily relocated to London where he took the lead role in the BBC series Call Me Mister.

Back in Australia, he played the lead role in the 1988 TV movie The Clean Machine. For his role as Inspector Ed Riordan, he won the Best Actor in a One-off Drama accolade at the 1988 Penguin Awards. In 1990 he co-starred with Ben Mendelsohn in the cult teen comedy The Big Steal. His performance as shonky car salesman Gordon Farkas remains one of his most remembered roles.

In 1992, Bisley joined the cast of Police Rescue, playing Senior Sergeant Kevin 'Nipper' Harris. He appeared in 29 episodes, leaving in 1995. He was next seen as Dr Henry King in the ABC-TV series  After this, he became a regular on the third and final season of the critically acclaimed satirical television series Frontline.

In 1998, he began to appear as a guest in Nine’s police drama series Water Rats, playing Detective Jack Christey. The following year, he became one of the lead actors on the show, replacing Colin Friels who had quit due to ill health. Bisley left the show in 2001 but it turned out that his final episode was also the series’ swansong.

Also a stage actor, Bisley has appeared in drama productions. His stage roles include parts in Ray Lawler's Summer of the Seventeenth Doll (1985/1995) and as Banjo Paterson in the musical theatre production of The Man from Snowy River: Arena Spectacular  (August–October 2002). In July 2003, he presented a season of television documentaries on the National Geographic Channel.

From 2007-2009, he played CMDR Steve Marshall on Sea Patrol. From 2016-2018. he was seen in the first two series of Doctor Doctor, playing the father of the lead character. In 2016, Bisley appeared as Harry Firth in the two-part Australian miniseries Brock on Network Ten. The miniseries was based on the life of Australian motor racing legend Peter Brock.

In 2013, he appeared as Dan Cody in Baz Luhrmann's adaptation of The Great Gatsby. He was also seen in the Australian films Red Hill (2010) and Boar (2017). He has revealed that he turned down a role in Baz Luhrmann's 1996 film Romeo + Juliet because he read the script and thought "this is going nowhere".. In 2022 he appeared in Mystery Road:Origins.

In 2013, Bisley published his first book, called Stillways: A Memoir. The book recounted his life growing up in Lake Munmorah, finishing when he was in his mid-teens. The book was well-received and was subsequently shortlisted for the 2014 Douglas Stewart Prize for Non-Fiction in the NSW Premier's Literary Awards, the Queensland Literary Awards, and the 2014 National Biography Award. In 2017, Bisley published his second book, a memoir called All the Burning Bridges. Picking up where Stillways had left off, it covered his adult life. He has said he does not plan to write any more memoirs. Instead, he is concentrating on writing his first novel.

Personal life
Steve Bisley has been married once. Prior to his marriage, he had four children with long-time partner Shauna Forrest. During the 1980s Forrest was a costume designer for models and actresses.

He married Sally Burleigh, a media publicist, in 2000. They had two children before divorcing in 2006. In September 2009 Bisley was charged with assaulting Burleigh and, on 15 September 2010, he was found guilty and sentenced to 300 hours of community service. Bisley lodged an appeal against the conviction. In July 2013 while promoting his autobiography, Stillways: A Memoir, he described the assault as "a push and shove incident with high emotion displayed on both sides".

Awards

 Winner AFI award for Best Supporting Actor for his role in the 1984 film Silver City.
 Winner AFI award for Best Supporting Actor for his role in the 1990 film The Big Steal.
 Member  of the Australian Film Walk of Fame in recognition of his film and television career.

Filmography

Film
Summer City (1977) .... Boo
Newsfront (1978) .... The Iceman
Taxi (TV movie) (1979) .... TerRyan Dean
Mad Max (1979) .... Jim Goose
The Last of the Knucklemen (1979) .... Mad Dog
The Chain Reaction (1980) .... Larry
The Highest Honor (1982) .... A.B. W.G. Falls
The Little Feller (1982) .... Frank Blair
Squizzy Taylor (1982) .... 'Snowy' Cutmore
The Winds of Jarrah (1983) .... Clem Mathieson
Fast Talking (1984) .... Redback
Silver City (1984) .... Victor
2 Friends (TV movie) (1986) .... Kevin
The Clean Machine (1988) .... Ed Riordan
Hard Knuckle (TV movie) (1988) .... Harry
The Big Steal (1990) .... Gordon Farkas
The Baby Boomers Picture Show (TV movie) (1990) .... Commentator/Self
Polska (documentary film) (1991) .... Narrator
Over the Hill (1992) .... Benedict
Nazi Supergrass (documentary film) (1993) .... Narrator
Sanctuary (1995) .... Robert 'Bob' King
In the Red (1999) .... Sparky
Big Reef (TV movie) (2004) .... Reilly
The Brush-Off (TV movie) (2004) .... Eastlake
Hell Has Harbour Views (TV movie) (2005) .... Bruce Kent
The Truckies’ Guide to Australia (documentary film) (2007) .... Self
The King (TV movie) (2007) .... Harry M Miller
The View from Greenhaven (2008) .... Lach
Not Quite Hollywood: The Wild, Untold Story of Ozploitation! (documentary film) (2008) .... Self
Actingclassof1977.com (documentary film) (2008) .... Self
Subdivision (2009) .... Harry
Red Hill (2010) .... Old Bill
I Love You Too (2010) .... Bill
The Wedding Party (2010) .... Roger
The Great Gatsby (2013) .... Dan Cody
Jack Irish: Bad Debts (TV movie) (2012) .... Kevin Pixley
Boar (2017) .... Bob

Television
Cop Shop (1978-84) .... Rod Conway / Bob Campbell (6 episodes)
The Sullivans (1979) .... Richard Granger (1 episode)
Lawson’s Mates (1980) .... (1 episode)
Spring & Fall (1980) .... Ray (1 episode)
The Last Outlaw (miniseries) (1980) .... Joe Byrne (4 episodes)
The Patchwork Hero (1981) .... Barney Jamieson (6 episodes)
A Town Like Alice (miniseries) (1981) .... Tim Whelan (1 episode)
Watch This Space (1982) .... Self
Jonah (1982) .... Cook (4 episodes)
A Country Practice (1984) .... Jim Dawson (2 episodes)
Boy in the Bush (miniseries) (1984) .... Esau (4 episodes)
Special Squad (1984) .... (1 episode)
The Flying Doctors (1985) .... Andy McGregor (3 episodes)
Studio 86 (1986) .... Peter Faulkner (1 episode)
Call Me Mister (1986) .... Jack Bartholemew
Emma: Queen of the South Seas (miniseries) (1988) .... Captain Tom Farrell (2 episodes)
E.A.R.T.H. Force (1990) .... Wooster (1 episode)
Boys from the Bush (1991) .... Bill (1 episode)
Police Rescue (1992-95) .... Sr Sgt Kevin ‘Nipper’ Harris
Eggshells (1993) .... Lester
Seven Deadly Sins (miniseries) (1993) .... Meadowvale Supervisor (1 episode)
Escape from Jupiter (miniseries) (1994) .... Duffy
Halifax f.p. (1995-96) .... Jonah Cole
G.P. (1995-96) .... Dr Henry King
Burke’s Backyard (1996) .... Self/Celebrity Gardener (1 episode)
Frontline (1997) .... Graham ’Prowsey’ Prowse
Water Rats (1998-2001) .... Detective Sgt Jack Christey
Stingers (2004) .... Donald Wylie (1 episode)
Australian Story (2005) .... Self (1 episode)
Two Twisted (miniseries) (2006) .... Frank (1 episode)
Sea Patrol (2007-09) .... Commander Steve Marshall (25 episodes)
East of Everything (2008-11) .... Terry Adams (11 episodes)
Lowdown (2010) .... Jack Cooper (1 episode)
Redfern Now (2013) .... Richard (1 episode)
Plonk (2014) .... Ian Tyler (1 episode)
Brock (miniseries) (2016) .... Harry Firth (2 episodes)
Doctor Doctor (2016–2018) .... Jim Knight (21 episodes)
SeaChange (2019) .... Judge Gavin Taylor (1 episode)
Grey Nomads (2020) .... Ernie Roache (6 episodes)
How to Stay Married (2020) .... Stuart (1 episode)
Mystery Road: Origin (2022) .... Peter Lovic (6 episodes)
Darby and Joan (2022) .... Declan Kemp (1 episode)

Shorts
Hell, Texas & Home (1994)
Shotgun! (2007) .... Tommy
The Stranger (2020) .... John

References 

 "The Dictionary of Performing Arts in Australia – Theatre . Film . Radio . Television – Volume 1" – Ann Atkinson, Linsay Knight, Margaret McPhee – Allen & Unwin Pty. Ltd., 1996
 "The Australian Film and Television Companion" – compiled by Tony Harrison – Simon & Schuster Australia, 1994

External links 
 
 Steve Bisley's Water Rats profile – Australian Television Information Archive

1951 births
20th-century Australian male actors
21st-century Australian male actors
Australian male film actors
Australian male musical theatre actors
Australian male stage actors
Australian male television actors
Australian memoirists
Living people
National Institute of Dramatic Art alumni